Lieutenant General Sir Robert Harold Carrington KCB DSO (7 November 1882 – 5 September 1964) was a British Army General during World War II.

Military career
Harold Carrington was commissioned into the Royal Field Artillery in 1901; he served in the Second Boer War between 1901 and 1902 and then transferred to the Royal Horse Artillery in 1908. He served during World War I and earned the DSO in 1916.

He remained in the Army after the War: in 1932, after attending the Staff College, Camberley in 1920, he became a General Staff Officer with 4th Infantry Division moving on to become Commander, Royal Artillery for the 4th Infantry Division in 1932. In 1936 he became a major general with command of the Royal Artillery at Army Headquarters in India. In 1939 he became Deputy Adjutant General at the War Office and in 1940 he was appointed General Officer Commanding-in-Chief Scottish Command and Governor of Edinburgh Castle: he retired in 1941.

He was also Colonel Commandant of the Royal Artillery from 1940 to 1950.

Retirement
In retirement he worked for the Ministry of Supply between 1942 and 1945. He was appointed High Sheriff of Suffolk for 1953–54.

References

Bibliography

External links
Generals of World War II

 

1882 births
1964 deaths
British Army personnel of World War I
Knights Commander of the Order of the Bath
Companions of the Distinguished Service Order
British Army generals of World War II
Royal Field Artillery officers
Royal Horse Artillery officers
High Sheriffs of Suffolk
British Army personnel of the Second Boer War
Graduates of the Staff College, Camberley
British Army lieutenant generals